Baseball had its first appearance at the 1912 Summer Olympics as a demonstration sport. A game was played between the United States, the nation where the game was developed, and Sweden, the host nation. The game was held on Monday, 15 July 1912 and started at 10a.m. on the Ostermalm Athletic Grounds in Stockholm.

The Americans were represented by various members of the American Olympic track and field athletics delegation, while the Swedish team was the Vesterås Baseball Club, which had been formed in 1910 as the first baseball club in Sweden. Four of the Americans played for Sweden, as the Swedish pitchers and catchers were inexperienced. One Swede eventually relieved Adams and Nelson, the American pitchers.

Six innings were played, with the Americans not batting in the sixth and allowing the Swedes to have six outs in their half of the inning.

The game was umpired by George Wright, a retired American National League baseball player.

Game result

Box score

Second match
On the next day Tuesday, 16 July 1912 in the evening, two American teams played a second exhibition match.

Box score

Notes

References
 
 Official Report. 1912 Stockholm Olympic Games. 1912.

 
1912 Summer Olympics events
1912
1912 in baseball
1912
Olympic demonstration sports